Luca Antonio Fiordilino (born 25 July 1996) is an Italian professional footballer who plays as a defensive midfielder for  club Südtirol, on loan from Venezia.

Club career
Fiordilino started his career at U.S. Città di Palermo in the youth system.

In July 2015 he was loaned to Cosenza of Lega Pro. In July 2016 he moved to Lega Pro side Lecce on loan.

On 24 July 2019, he signed a 3-year contract with Venezia. On 19 January 2023, Fiordilino joined Südtirol on loan with an option to buy.

References

External links

1996 births
Footballers from Palermo
Living people
Italian footballers
Association football midfielders
Palermo F.C. players
Cosenza Calcio players
U.S. Lecce players
Venezia F.C. players
F.C. Südtirol players
Serie A players
Serie B players
Serie C players